The Inter-agency Network for Education in Emergencies (INEE) is an open global network of members working together to ensure all persons the right to quality and safe education in emergencies and post-crisis recovery. INEE members are from NGOs, UN agencies, donor agencies, governments, academic institutions, schools, and affected populations.

INEE Minimum Standards
The INEE Minimum Standards for Education: Preparedness, Response, Recovery are both a handbook and an expression of commitment that children, youth, and adults have a right to education during emergencies and fragile contexts, such as natural disasters and armed conflicts. The standards are founded on the Convention on the Rights of the Child, the Dakar 2000 Education for All goals and the Sphere Project’s Humanitarian Charter. The current edition of the handbook was published in 2010, following an extensive review and update of the original 2004 edition by thousands of individuals from more than 50 countries.

Network Spaces
INEE is a network of more than 16,000 individual members and 130 partner organizations in 190 countries. INEE members are practitioners working for national and international NGOs and UN agencies, ministry of education and other government personnel, donors, students, teachers, and researchers who voluntarily join in the work related to education in emergencies. INEE exists for and because of its members.

INEE maintains a core staff team, the INEE Secretariat, that represents the network, leads and supports network activities, and coordinates network processes, systems and projects. INEE Secretariat staff are hosted by INEE Steering Group member agencies, which not only helps to ensure promotion and institutionalization of education in emergencies within those agencies but is also cost-efficient.

The INEE Steering Group sets goals and plans for the network, approves new working groups and task teams, and provides strategic guidance to the Secretariat staff. The INEE Steering Group is composed of ten organizational members, represented by senior professionals in the field of education in emergencies.

INEE Working Groups are formal groups of institutional members who work together to implement specific activities toward the achievement of the INEE Strategic Plan. Working Groups are composed of experts and practitioners from a variety of international organisations and institutions, and membership is gained through an application process.

INEE Language Communities are vibrant forums that foster collaborative resource development and knowledge-sharing among Arabic, French, Portuguese, and Spanish-speaking members of INEE. The INEE Language Communities collate and disseminate key resources in the relevant languages, and where gaps are identified, work to develop or translate new tools and case studies. The Language Communities also undertake advocacy and outreach in Arabic-speaking, Lusophone, Francophone and Hispanophone countries, raising awareness about the importance of education for those affected by crisis. Furthermore, the Language Communities support and facilitate training and capacity-building opportunities for non-Anglophone INEE Members.

INEE Task Teams allow INEE members to work collectively on specific areas of interest, advocating for these key cross-cutting issues and collaboratively developing tools and resources to help practitioners provide inclusive, quality and safe education for all affected by crisis. Task Team membership is open to any INEE member.

Journal 
The organization works with New York University to publish the Journal on Education in Emergencies.

See also 
 Children in emergencies and conflicts

References

External links

International educational charities